Benigno Simeon "Igno" Quiambao Aquino Sr. (born Benigno Simeón Aquino y Quiambao; September 3, 1894 – December 20, 1947) was a Filipino politician who served as Speaker of the National Assembly of the Japanese-sponsored puppet state in the Philippines from 1943 to 1944.

He was the Director-General of KALIBAPI, a political party established during the Japanese occupation of the Philippines.

His grandson, Benigno S. Aquino III was the 15th President of the Philippines from 2010 to 2016.

Early life
Aquino was born in Murcia (now part of Concepcion, Tarlac) in the town of Tarlac to Servillano "Mianong" Aquino, a general in the Philippine Revolution who later served as a member of the Malolos Congress, and Guadalupe Quiambao. He had two siblings: Gonzalo Aquino (1893–??) and Amando Aquino (1896–??), and a half-brother, Herminio Aquino (1949–2021). He studied at the Colegio de San Juan de Letran in Manila and later at the University of Santo Tomas, where he earned his law degree in 1913, and was admitted to the bar the following year.

Political career
Aquino was first elected to the Philippine Legislature as a member of the Philippine House of Representatives in 1919 representing the 2nd district of Tarlac. He was reelected to the same position in 1922 and 1925 before winning a Philippine Senate seat in 1928 representing the 3rd Senatorial District comprising the provinces of Bulacan, Nueva Ecija, Pampanga and his home-province of Tarlac. He became part of the Philippine Independence Mission in 1931, which negotiated the terms of obtaining Philippine independence from the United States. During the elections for the Commonwealth of the Philippines government in 1935 he ran again in his district in Tarlac and won, this time as a member of the National Assembly. In 1937, he was appointed by Commonwealth President Manuel L. Quezon as Secretary of Agriculture and Commerce.

Speaker of the National Assembly

Being among the more prominent Commonwealth officials remaining in the country after the Commonwealth government went into exile in 1941, Aquino was among those recruited by the Japanese to form a government. He became the director-general of KALIBAPI and one of the two assistant chairmen of the Preparatory Commission for Philippine Independence. When the Second Philippine Republic was inaugurated, he was elected Speaker of the National Assembly.

Arrest and collaboration charges

In December 1944, as the combined Filipino and American forces continued their advance to liberate the Philippines from Japanese forces, the government of the Second Philippine Republic, which included Aquino, was moved to Baguio. Subsequently, they travelled to Tuguegarao, where they were flown to Japan via Formosa (now Taiwan) and Shanghai, China. On September 15, 1945, while in Nara, Aquino, alongside former President Jose P. Laurel and his son Jose III, was arrested and placed into custody by Americans led by Colonel Turner following the surrender of Japan. They were imprisoned at Yokohama prison and two months later at Sugamo Prison. On July 23, 1946, they were flown back to the Philippines for trial on treason charges by the People's Court. A few weeks later, he was released on bail.

Personal life

First marriage
In May 1916, he married Maria Urquico, the daughter of katipunero Antonio Urquico and Justa Valeriano. He had two sons and two daughters with Maria: Antonio Aquino “Tony” (1917–1993), Servillano Aquino II “Billy” (1919–1973), Milagros Aquino “Mila” (1924–2001), and Erlinda Aquino “Linda” (1926-2022).

Second marriage
After Maria died in March 1928, he married Aurora Lampa Aquino (maiden name, granddaughter of Melencio Aquino and Evarista de los Santos and daughter of Agapito de los Santos Aquino and Gerarda Miranda Lampa) on December 6, 1930, with whom he had seven children—Maria Aurora (Maur), Benigno Simeon Jr. (Ninoy), Maria Gerarda (Ditas), Maria Guadalupe (Lupita), Agapito (Butz), Paul, and Maria Teresa (Tessie).

Death
On December 20, 1947, Aquino died of a heart attack at the Rizal Memorial Coliseum in Manila while watching a boxing match.

Ancestry

See also
Second Philippine Republic
National Assembly of the Second Philippine Republic
Speaker of the House of Representatives of the Philippines

References

External links

 . Accessed on April 24, 2007.
 Allied Families: Aquino-Cojuangco. Accessed on April 25, 2007.
 Sugar and the Origins of Modern Philippine Society. Accessed on April 25, 2007.

1894 births
1947 deaths
Benigno Aquino 1
Colegio de San Juan de Letran alumni
Filipino collaborators with Imperial Japan
Filipino Roman Catholics
Kapampangan people
Majority leaders of the Senate of the Philippines
Senators of the 8th Philippine Legislature
Senators of the 9th Philippine Legislature
Members of the House of Representatives of the Philippines from Tarlac
Secretaries of Agriculture of the Philippines
Secretaries of Trade and Industry of the Philippines
Nacionalista Party politicians
People from Tarlac
Speakers of the House of Representatives of the Philippines
Quezon administration cabinet members
Unofficial vice presidents of the Philippines
Majority leaders of the House of Representatives of the Philippines
University of Santo Tomas alumni
Members of the National Assembly of the Philippines
Members of the National Assembly (Second Philippine Republic)
KALIBAPI politicians
20th-century Filipino lawyers
Secretaries of the Interior and Local Government of the Philippines
Prisoners and detainees of the United States military